Myrmosa is a genus of wasps belonging to the family Myrmosidae.

Selected species
 Myrmosa atra
 Myrmosa moesica
 Myrmosa unicolor

References

Myrmosidae
Hymenoptera genera